Political philosophy or political theory is the philosophical study of government, addressing questions about the nature, scope, and legitimacy of public agents and institutions and the relationships between them. Its topics include politics, liberty, justice, property, rights, law, and the enforcement of laws by authority: what they are, if they are needed, what makes a government legitimate, what rights and freedoms it should protect, what form it should take, what the law is, and what duties citizens owe to a legitimate government, if any, and when it may be legitimately overthrown, if ever. 

Political theory also engages questions of a broader scope, tackling the political nature of phenomena and categories such as identity, culture, sexuality, race, wealth, human-nonhuman relations, ethics, religion, and more.

Political science, the scientific study of politics, is generally used in the singular, but in French and Spanish the plural (sciences politiques and ciencias políticas, respectively) is used, perhaps a reflection of the discipline's eclectic nature.

Political philosophy is a branch of philosophy, but it has also played a major part of political science, within which a strong focus has historically been placed on both the history of political thought and contemporary political theory (from normative political theory to various critical approaches).

In the Oxford Handbook of Political Theory (2009), the field is described as: "[...] an interdisciplinary endeavor whose center of gravity lies at the humanities end of the happily still undisciplined discipline of political science ... For a long time, the challenge for the identity of political theory has been how to position itself productively in three sorts of location: in relation to the academic disciplines of political science, history, and philosophy; between the world of politics and the more abstract, ruminative register of theory; between canonical political theory and the newer resources (such as feminist and critical theory, discourse analysis, film and film theory, popular and political culture, mass media studies, neuroscience, environmental studies, behavioral science, and economics) on which political theorists increasingly draw."

History

Ancient traditions

Ancient India 
Indian political philosophy  in ancient times demarcated a clear distinction between (1) nation and state (2) religion and state. The constitutions of Hindu states evolved over time and were based on political and legal treatises and prevalent social institutions. The institutions of state were broadly divided into governance, diplomacy,  administration, defense, law and order. Mantranga, the principal governing body of these states, consisted of the King, Prime Minister, Commander in chief of army, Chief Priest of the King. The Prime Minister headed the committee of ministers along with head of executive (Maha Amatya).

Chanakya was a 4th-century BC Indian political philosopher. The Arthashastra provides an account of the science of politics for a wise ruler, policies for foreign affairs and wars, the system of a spy state and surveillance and economic stability of the state. Chanakya quotes several authorities including Bruhaspati, Ushanas, Prachetasa Manu, Parasara, and Ambi, and described himself as a descendant of a lineage of political philosophers, with his father Chanaka being his immediate predecessor. Another influential extant Indian treatise on political philosophy is the Sukra Neeti. An example of a code of law in ancient India is the Manusmṛti or Laws of Manu.

Ancient China 

Chinese political philosophy dates back to the Spring and Autumn period, specifically with Confucius in the 6th century BC. Chinese political philosophy was developed as a response to the social and political breakdown of the country characteristic of the Spring and Autumn period and the Warring States period. The major philosophies during the period, Confucianism, Legalism, Mohism, Agrarianism and Taoism, each had a political aspect to their philosophical schools. Philosophers such as Confucius, Mencius, and Mozi, focused on political unity and political stability as the basis of their political philosophies. Confucianism advocated a hierarchical, meritocratic government based on empathy, loyalty, and interpersonal relationships. Legalism advocated a highly authoritarian government based on draconian punishments and laws. Mohism advocated a communal, decentralized government centered on frugality and asceticism. The Agrarians advocated a peasant utopian communalism and egalitarianism. Taoism advocated a proto-anarchism. Legalism was the dominant political philosophy of the Qin Dynasty, but was replaced by State Confucianism in the Han Dynasty. Prior to China's adoption of communism, State Confucianism remained the dominant political philosophy of China up to the 20th century.

Ancient Greece 
Western political philosophy originates in the philosophy of ancient Greece, where political philosophy dates back to at least Plato. Ancient Greece was dominated by city-states, which experimented with various forms of political organization. Plato grouped forms of government into five categories of descending stability and morality: republic, timocracy, oligarchy, democracy and tyranny. One of the first, extremely important classical works of political philosophy is Plato's Republic, which was followed by Aristotle's Nicomachean Ethics and Politics. Roman political philosophy was influenced by the Stoics and the Roman statesman Cicero.

Medieval Christianity

Saint Augustine 

The early Christian philosophy of Augustine of Hippo was heavily influenced by Plato. A key change brought about by Christian thought was the moderation of the Stoicism and theory of justice of the Roman world, as well emphasis on the role of the state in applying mercy as a moral example. Augustine also preached that one was not a member of his or her city, but was either a citizen of the City of God (Civitas Dei) or the Earthly City (Civitas Terrena). Augustine's City of God is an influential work of this period that attacked the thesis, held by many Christian Romans, that the Christian view could be realized on Earth.

St. Thomas Aquinas 

Thomas Aquinas meticulously dealt with the varieties of philosophy of law. According to Aquinas, there are four kinds of law:

 Eternal law ("the divine government of everything")
 Divine positive law (having been "posited" by God; external to human nature)
 Natural law (the right way of living discoverable by natural reason; what cannot-not be known; internal to human nature)
 Human law (what we commonly call "law"—including customary law; the law of the Communitas Perfecta)

Aquinas never discusses the nature or categorization of canon law. There is scholarly debate surrounding the place of canon law within the Thomistic jurisprudential framework.

Aquinas was an incredibly influential thinker in the Natural Law tradition.

Islamic Political Evolution

Mutazilite vs. Asharite 

The rise of Islam, based on both the Qur'an and Muhammad strongly altered the power balances and perceptions of origin of power in the Mediterranean region. Early Islamic philosophy emphasized an inexorable link between science and religion, and the process of ijtihad to find truth—in effect all philosophy was "political" as it had real implications for governance. This view was challenged by the "rationalist" Mutazilite philosophers, who held a more Hellenic view, reason above revelation, and as such are known to modern scholars as the first speculative theologians of Islam; they were supported by a secular aristocracy who sought freedom of action independent of the Caliphate. By the late ancient period, however, the "traditionalist" Asharite view of Islam had in general triumphed. According to the Asharites, reason must be subordinate to the Quran and the Sunna.

Islamic political philosophy, was, indeed, rooted in the very sources of Islam—i.e., the Qur'an and the Sunnah, the words and practices of Muhammad—thus making it essentially theocratic. However, in Western thought, it is generally supposed that it was a specific area peculiar merely to the great philosophers of Islam: al-Kindi (Alkindus), al-Farabi (Abunaser), İbn Sina (Avicenna), Ibn Bajjah (Avempace) and Ibn Rushd (Averroes). The political conceptions of Islam such as kudrah (power), sultan, ummah, cemaa (obligation)-and even the "core" terms of the Qur'an—i.e., ibadah (worship), din (religion), rab (master) and ilah (deity)—is taken as the basis of an analysis. Hence, not only the ideas of the Muslim political philosophers but also many other jurists and ulama posed political ideas and theories. For example, the ideas of the Khawarij in the very early years of Islamic history on Khilafa and Ummah, or that of Shia Islam on the concept of Imamah are considered proofs of political thought. The clashes between the Ehl-i Sunna and Shia in the 7th and 8th centuries had a genuine political character. Political thought was not purely rooted in theism, however. Aristotleanism flourished as the Islamic Golden Age saw rise to a continuation of the peripatetic philosophers who implemented the ideas of Aristotle in the context of the Islamic world. Abunaser, Avicenna and Ibn Rushd where part of this philosophical school who claimed that human reason surpassed mere coincidence and revelation. They believed, for example, that natural phenomena occur because of certain rules (made by god), not because god interfered directly (unlike Al-Ghazali and his followers).

Other notable political philosophers of the time include Nizam al-Mulk, a Persian scholar and vizier of the Seljuq Empire who composed the Siyasatnama, or the "Book of Government" in English. In it, he details the role of the state in terms of political affairs (i.e. how to deal with political opponents without ruining the government's image), as well as its duty to protect the poor and reward the worthy. In his other work, he explains how the state should deal with other issues such as supplying jobs to immigrants like the Turkmens who were coming from the north (present day southern Russia, Kazakhstan, Turkmenistan and Uzbekistan).

Ibn Khaldun 

The 14th-century Arab scholar Ibn Khaldun is considered one of the greatest political theorists. The British philosopher-anthropologist Ernest Gellner considered Ibn Khaldun's definition of government, "...an institution which prevents injustice other than such as it commits itself," the best in the history of political theory. For Ibn Khaldun, government should be restrained to a minimum for as a necessary evil, it is the constraint of men by other men.

Medieval Europe 
Medieval political philosophy in Europe was heavily influenced by Christian thinking. It had much in common with the Mutazilite Islamic thinking in that the Roman Catholics thought subordinating philosophy to theology did not subject reason to revelation but in the case of contradictions, subordinated reason to faith as the Asharite of Islam. The Scholastics by combining the philosophy of Aristotle with the Christianity of St. Augustine emphasized the potential harmony inherent in reason and revelation. Perhaps the most influential political philosopher of medieval Europe was St. Thomas Aquinas who helped reintroduce Aristotle's works, which had only been transmitted to Catholic Europe through Muslim Spain, along with the commentaries of Averroes. Aquinas's use of them set the agenda, for scholastic political philosophy dominated European thought for centuries even unto the Renaissance.

Some medieval political philosophers, such as Aquinas in his Summa Theologica, developed the idea that a king who is a tyrant is no king at all and could be overthrown. Others, like Nicole Oresme in his Livre de Politiques, categorically denied this right to overthrow an unjust ruler.

The Magna Carta, viewed by many as a cornerstone of Anglo-American political liberty, explicitly proposes the right to revolt against the ruler for justice's sake. Other documents similar to Magna Carta are found in other European countries such as Spain and Hungary.

European Renaissance 
During the Renaissance secular political philosophy began to emerge after about a century of theological political thought in Europe. While the Middle Ages did see secular politics in practice under the rule of the Holy Roman Empire, the academic field was wholly scholastic and therefore Christian in nature.

Niccolò Machiavelli 

One of the most influential works during this burgeoning period was Niccolò Machiavelli's The Prince, written between 1511–12 and published in 1532, after Machiavelli's death. That work, as well as The Discourses, a rigorous analysis of classical antiquity, did much to influence modern political thought in the West. A minority (including Jean-Jacques Rousseau) interpreted The Prince as a satire meant to be given to the Medici after their recapture of Florence and their subsequent expulsion of Machiavelli from Florence. Though the work was written for the di Medici family in order to perhaps influence them to free him from exile, Machiavelli supported the Republic of Florence rather than the oligarchy of the Medici family. At any rate, Machiavelli presents a pragmatic and somewhat consequentialist view of politics, whereby good and evil are mere means used to bring about an end—i.e., the acquisition and maintenance of absolute power. Thomas Hobbes, well known for his theory of the social contract, goes on to expand this view at the start of the 17th century during the English Renaissance. Although neither Machiavelli nor Hobbes believed in the divine right of kings, they both believed in the inherent selfishness of the individual. It was necessarily this belief that led them to adopt a strong central power as the only means of preventing the disintegration of the social order.

European Enlightenment 
During the Enlightenment period, new theories emerged about what the human was and is and about the definition of reality and the way it was perceived, along with the discovery of other societies in the Americas, and the changing needs of political societies (especially in the wake of the English Civil War, the American Revolution, the French Revolution, and the Haitian Revolution). These new theories led to new questions and insights by such thinkers as Thomas Hobbes, John Locke, Benjamin Constant and Jean-Jacques Rousseau.

These theorists were driven by two basic questions: one, by what right or need do people form states; and two, what the best form for a state could be. These fundamental questions involved a conceptual distinction between the concepts of "state" and "government." It was decided that "state" would refer to a set of enduring institutions through which power would be distributed and its use justified. The term "government" would refer to a specific group of people who occupied the institutions of the state, and create the laws and ordinances by which the people, themselves included, would be bound. This conceptual distinction continues to operate in political science, although some political scientists, philosophers, historians and cultural anthropologists have argued that most political action in any given society occurs outside of its state, and that there are societies that are not organized into states that nevertheless must be considered in political terms. As long as the concept of natural order was not introduced, the social sciences could not evolve independently of theistic thinking. Since the cultural revolution of the 17th century in England, which spread to France and the rest of Europe, society has been considered subject to natural laws akin to the physical world.

Political and economic relations were drastically influenced by these theories as the concept of the guild was subordinated to the theory of free trade, and Roman Catholic dominance of theology was increasingly challenged by Protestant churches subordinate to each nation-state, which also (in a fashion the Roman Catholic Church often decried angrily) preached in the vulgar or native language of each region. Free trade, as opposed to these religious theories, is a trade policy that does not restrict imports or exports. It can also be understood as the free market idea applied to international trade. In government, free trade is predominantly advocated by political parties that hold liberal economic positions while economically left-wing and nationalist political parties generally support protectionism, the opposite of free trade. However, the enlightenment was an outright attack on religion, particularly Christianity. The most outspoken critic of the church in France was François Marie Arouet de Voltaire, a representative figure of the enlightenment.

Historians have described Voltaire's description of the history of Christianity as "propagandistic". Voltaire is partially responsible for the misattribution of the expression Credo quia absurdum to the Church Fathers. In a letter to Frederick II, King of Prussia, dated 5 January 1767, he wrote about Christianity: La nôtre [religion] est sans contredit la plus ridicule, la plus absurde, et la plus sanguinaire qui ait jamais infecté le monde.
"Ours [i.e., the Christian religion] is assuredly the most ridiculous, the most absurd and the most bloody religion which has ever infected this world. Your Majesty will do the human race an eternal service by extirpating this infamous superstition, I do not say among the rabble, who are not worthy of being enlightened and who are apt for every yoke; I say among honest people, among men who think, among those who wish to think. ... My one regret in dying is that I cannot aid you in this noble enterprise, the finest and most respectable which the human mind can point out." After Voltaire, religion would never be the same again in France.

As well, there was no spread of this doctrine within the New World and the advanced civilizations of the Aztec, Maya, Inca, Mohican, Delaware, Huron and especially the Iroquois. The Iroquois philosophy, in particular, gave much to Christian thought of the time and in many cases actually inspired some of the institutions adopted in the United States: for example, Benjamin Franklin was a great admirer of some of the methods of the Iroquois Confederacy, and much of early American literature emphasized the political philosophy of the natives. The Iroquois (/ˈɪrəkwɔɪ/ or /ˈɪrəkwɑː/) or Haudenosaunee are a historically powerful northeast Native American confederacy in North America. They were known during the colonial years to the French as the Iroquois League, and later as the Iroquois Confederacy, and to the English as the Five Nations, comprising the Mohawk, Onondaga, Oneida, Cayuga, and Seneca. After 1722, they accepted the Tuscarora people from the Southeast into their confederacy, as they were also Iroquoian-speaking, and became known as the Six Nations.

John Locke 

John Locke in particular exemplified this new age of political theory with his work Two Treatises of Government. In it, Locke proposes a state of nature theory that directly complements his conception of how political development occurs and how it can be founded through contractual obligation. Locke stood to refute Sir Robert Filmer's paternally founded political theory in favor of a natural system based on nature in a particular given system. The theory of the divine right of kings became a passing fancy, exposed to the type of ridicule with which John Locke treated it. Unlike Machiavelli and Hobbes but like Aquinas, Locke would accept Aristotle's dictum that man seeks to be happy in a state of social harmony as a social animal. Unlike Aquinas's preponderant view on the salvation of the soul from original sin, Locke believes man's mind comes into this world as tabula rasa. For Locke, knowledge is neither innate, revealed nor based on authority but subject to uncertainty tempered by reason, tolerance and moderation. According to Locke, an absolute ruler as proposed by Hobbes is unnecessary, for natural law is based on reason and seeking peace and survival for man.

John Stuart Mill 

John Stuart Mill's work on political philosophy begins in On Liberty. On Liberty is the most influential statement of his liberal principles. He begins by distinguishing old and new threats to liberty. The old threat to liberty is found in traditional societies in which there is rule by one (a monarchy) or a few (an aristocracy). Though one could be worried about restrictions on liberty by benevolent monarchs or aristocrats, the traditional worry is that when rulers are politically unaccountable to the governed they will rule in their own interests, rather than the interests of the governed. Mill's explicit theory of rights is introduced in Chapter V of Utilitarianism in the context of his sanction theory of duty, which is an indirect form of utilitarianism that identifies wrong actions as actions that it is useful to sanction. Mill then introduces justice as a proper part of the duty. Justice involves duties that are perfect duties—that is, duties that are correlated with rights.
Justice implies something which it is not only right to do, and wrong not to do, but which some individual person can claim from us as a matter of right. These perfect duties will thus create liberty and collective freedom within a state.
He uses, On Liberty to discuss gender equality in society. To Mill, Utilitarianism was the perfect tool to justify gender equality in The Subjection of Women, referring to the political, lawful and social subjection of women. When a woman was married, she entered legally binding coverture with her husband; once she married her legal existence as an individual was suspended under "marital unity". While it is easy to presume that a woman would not marry under these circumstances, being unmarried had social consequences. A woman could only advance in social stature and wealth if she had a rich husband to do the groundwork. Mill uses his Utilitarian ethics to assess how gender equality would be the best way to achieve "the greatest good for the greatest number" :
"The principle that regulates the existing social relations between the two sexes … and is now one of the chief obstacles to human improvement…"

The ‘chief obstacle’ to Mill relates to women's intellectual capability. The Subjection of Women looks at this in the women of society and argues that diminishing their intellectual potential wastes the knowledge and skill of half of the population; such knowledge lost could formulate ideas that could maximize pleasure for society.

Benjamin Constant 

One of the first thinkers to go by the name of "liberal", Constant looked to Britain rather than to ancient Rome for a practical model of freedom in a large, commercial society. He drew a distinction between the "Liberty of the Ancients" and the "Liberty of the Moderns". The Liberty of the Ancients was participatory republican liberty, which gave the citizens the right to directly influence politics through debates and votes in the public assembly. In order to support this degree of participation, citizenship was a burdensome moral obligation requiring a considerable investment of time and energy. Generally, this required a sub-society of slaves to do much of the productive work, leaving the citizens free to deliberate on public affairs. Ancient Liberty was also limited to relatively small and homogenous societies, in which the people could be conveniently gathered together in one place to transact public affairs.

The Liberty of the Moderns, in contrast, was based on the possession of civil liberties, the rule of law, and freedom from excessive state interference. Direct participation would be limited: a necessary consequence of the size of modern states, and also the inevitable result of having created a commercial society in which there are no slaves but almost everybody must earn a living through work. Instead, the voters would elect representatives, who would deliberate in Parliament on behalf of the people and would save citizens from the necessity of daily political involvement.

Moreover, Constant believed that, in the modern world, commerce was superior to war. He attacked Napoleon's martial appetite, on the grounds that it was illiberal and no longer suited to modern commercial social organization. Ancient Liberty tended to be warlike, whereas a state organized on the principles of Modern Liberty would be at peace with all peaceful nations.

Thomas Hobbes 

The main practical conclusion of Hobbes' political theory is that state or society can not be secure unless at the disposal of an absolute sovereign. From this follows the view that no individual can hold rights of property against the sovereign, and that the sovereign may therefore take the goods of its subjects without their consent.

In Leviathan, Hobbes set out his doctrine of the foundation of states and legitimate governments and creating an objective science of morality. Much of the book is occupied with demonstrating the necessity of a strong central authority to avoid the evil of discord and civil war.

Beginning from a mechanistic understanding of human beings and their passions, Hobbes postulates what life would be like without government, a condition which he calls the state of nature. In that state, each person would have a right, or license, to everything in the world. This, Hobbes argues, would lead to a "war of all against all".

Jean-Jacques Rousseau 

The Social Contract outlines the basis for a legitimate political order within a framework of classical republicanism. Published in 1762, it became one of the most influential works of political philosophy in the Western tradition. It developed some of the ideas mentioned in earlier work, the article Discours sur l'oeconomie politique (Discourse on Political Economy), featured in Diderot's Encyclopédie. The treatise begins with the dramatic opening lines, "Man is born free, and everywhere he is in chains. Those who think themselves the masters of others are indeed greater slaves than they."

Rousseau claimed that the state of nature was a primitive condition without law or morality, which human beings left for the benefits and necessity of cooperation. As society developed, the division of labor and private property required the human race to adopt institutions of law. In the degenerate phase of society, man is prone to be in frequent competition with his fellow men while also becoming increasingly dependent on them. This double pressure threatens both his survival and his freedom.

Industrialization and the modern era 
The Marxist critique of capitalism—developed with Friedrich Engels—was, alongside liberalism and fascism, one of the defining ideological movements of the twentieth century. The industrial revolution produced a parallel revolution in political thought. Urbanization and capitalism greatly reshaped society. During this same period, the socialist movement began to form. In the mid-19th century, Marxism was developed, and socialism in general gained increasing popular support, mostly from the urban working class. Without breaking entirely from the past, Marx established principles that would be used by future revolutionaries of the 20th century namely Vladimir Lenin, Mao Zedong, Ho Chi Minh, and Fidel Castro. Though Hegel's philosophy of history is similar to Immanuel Kant's, and Karl Marx's theory of revolution towards the common good is partly based on Kant's view of history—Marx declared that he was turning Hegel's dialectic, which was "standing on its head", "the right side up again". Unlike Marx who believed in historical materialism, Hegel believed in the Phenomenology of Spirit. By the late 19th century, socialism and trade unions were established members of the political landscape. In addition, the various branches of anarchism, with thinkers such as Mikhail Bakunin, Pierre-Joseph Proudhon or Peter Kropotkin, and syndicalism also gained some prominence. In the Anglo-American world, anti-imperialism and pluralism began gaining currency at the turn of the 20th century.

World War I was a watershed event in human history, changing views of governments and politics. The Russian Revolution of 1917 (and similar, albeit less successful, revolutions in many other European countries) brought communism—and in particular the political theory of Leninism, but also on a smaller level Luxemburgism (gradually)—on the world stage. At the same time, social democratic parties won elections and formed governments for the first time, often as a result of the introduction of universal suffrage.

Contemporary 

In a 1956 American Political Science Review report authored by Harry Eckstein, political philosophy as a discipline had utility in two ways: the utility of political philosophy might be found either in the intrinsic ability of the best of past political thought to sharpen the wits of contemporary political thinkers, much as any difficult intellectual exercise sharpens the mind and deepens the imagination, or in the ability of political philosophy to serve as a thought-saving device by providing the political scientist with a rich source of concepts, models, insights, theories, and methods.From the end of World War II until 1971, when John Rawls published A Theory of Justice, political philosophy declined in the Anglo-American academic world, as analytic philosophers expressed skepticism about the possibility that normative judgments had cognitive content, and political science turned toward statistical methods and behavioralism. In continental Europe, on the other hand, the postwar decades saw a huge blossoming of political philosophy, with Marxism dominating the field. This was the time of Jean-Paul Sartre and Louis Althusser; and the victories of Mao Zedong in China and Fidel Castro in Cuba, as well as the events of May 1968, led to increased interest in revolutionary ideology, especially by the New Left. A number of continental European émigrés to Britain and the United States—including Karl Popper, Friedrich Hayek, Leo Strauss, Hannah Arendt, Isaiah Berlin, Eric Voegelin and Judith Shklar—encouraged continued study in political philosophy in the Anglo-American world, but in the 1950s and 1960s, they and their students remained at odds with the analytic establishment.

Communism remained an important focus especially during the 1950s and 1960s. Colonialism and racism were important issues that arose. In general, there was a marked trend towards a pragmatic approach to political issues, rather than a philosophical one. Much academic debate regarded one or both of two pragmatic topics: how (or whether) to apply utilitarianism to problems of political policy, or how (or whether) to apply economic models (such as rational choice theory) to political issues. The rise of feminism, LGBT social movements and the end of colonial rule and of the political exclusion of such minorities as African Americans and sexual minorities in the developed world has led to feminist, postcolonial, and multicultural thought becoming significant. This led to a challenge to the social contract by philosophers Charles W. Mills in his book The Racial Contract and Carole Pateman in her book The Sexual Contract that the social contract excluded persons of colour and women respectively.

In Anglo-American academic political philosophy, the publication of John Rawls's A Theory of Justice in 1971 is considered a milestone. Rawls used a thought experiment, the original position, in which representative parties choose principles of justice for the basic structure of society from behind a veil of ignorance. Rawls also offered a criticism of utilitarian approaches to questions of political justice. Robert Nozick's 1974 book Anarchy, State, and Utopia, which won a National Book Award, responded to Rawls from a libertarian perspective and gained academic respectability for libertarian viewpoints.

Contemporaneously with the rise of analytic ethics in Anglo-American thought, in Europe, several new lines of philosophy directed at the critique of existing societies arose between the 1950s and 1980s. Most of these took elements of Marxist economic analysis but combined them with a more cultural or ideological emphasis. Out of the Frankfurt School, thinkers like Herbert Marcuse, Theodor W. Adorno, Max Horkheimer, and Jürgen Habermas combined Marxian and Freudian perspectives. Along somewhat different lines, a number of other continental thinkers—still largely influenced by Marxism—put new emphases on structuralism and on a "return to Hegel". Within the (post-) structuralist line (though mostly not taking that label) are thinkers such as Gilles Deleuze, Michel Foucault, Claude Lefort, and Jean Baudrillard. The Situationists were more influenced by Hegel; Guy Debord, in particular, moved a Marxist analysis of commodity fetishism to the realm of consumption, and looked at the relation between consumerism and dominant ideology formation.

Another debate developed around the (distinct) criticisms of liberal political theory made by Michael Walzer, Michael Sandel and Charles Taylor. The liberal-communitarian debate is often considered valuable for generating a new set of philosophical problems, rather than a profound and illuminating clash of perspective. These and other communitarians (such as Alasdair MacIntyre and Daniel A. Bell) argue that, contra liberalism, communities are prior to individuals and therefore should be the center of political focus. Communitarians tend to support greater local control as well as economic and social policies which encourage the growth of social capital.

A prominent subject in recent political philosophy is the theory of deliberative democracy. The seminal work was done by Jurgen Habermas in Germany, but the most extensive literature has been in English, led by theorists such as Jane Mansbridge, Joshua Cohen, Amy Gutmann and Dennis Thompson.

A pair of overlapping political perspectives arising toward the end of the 20th century are republicanism (or neo- or civic-republicanism) and the capability approach. The resurgent republican movement aims to provide an alternate definition of liberty from Isaiah Berlin's positive and negative forms of liberty, namely "liberty as non-domination." Unlike the American liberal movement which understands liberty as "non-interference," "non-domination" entails individuals not being subject to the arbitrary will of any other person. To a republican the mere status as a slave, regardless of how that slave is treated, is objectionable. Prominent republicans include historian Quentin Skinner, jurist Cass Sunstein, and political philosopher Philip Pettit. The capability approach, pioneered by economists Mahbub ul Haq and Amartya Sen and further developed by legal scholar Martha Nussbaum, understands freedom under allied lines: the real-world ability to act. Both the capability approach and republicanism treat choice as something which must be resourced. In other words, it is not enough to be legally able to do something, but to have the real option of doing it.

Another important strand of contemporary political theory in North America draws on thinkers such as Friedrich Nietzsche, Michel Foucault, Jacques Derrida, and Gilles Deleuze, among others, to develop critiques and articulate alternatives to the sufficiency of the liberal-communitarian debate and republicanism discourse. Since the 1990s, these political theorists, broadly engaging the "genealogical approach", "deconstruction", and "weak ontology", have expanded the scope of political theory and issued a variety of arguments on topics such as pluralism, agonism, gender performativity, secularism, and more recently the Anthropocene and the non-human turn. The works of Judith Butler, William E. Connolly, Wendy Brown, Jane Bennett, Bonnie Honig and Chantal Mouffe have been highly pertinent in this regard.

Influential political philosophers 
A larger list of political philosophers is intended to be closer to exhaustive. Listed below are some of the most canonical or important thinkers, and especially philosophers whose central focus was in political philosophy and/or who are good representatives of a particular school of thought.
 Thomas Aquinas: In synthesizing Christian theology and Peripatetic (Aristotelian) teaching in his Treatise on Law, Aquinas contends that God's gift of higher reason—manifest in human law by way of the divine virtues—gives way to the assembly of righteous government.
 Aristotle: Wrote his Politics as an extension of his Nicomachean Ethics. Notable for the theories that humans are social animals, and that the polis (Ancient Greek city state) existed to bring about the good life appropriate to such animals. His political theory is based upon an ethics of perfectionism (as is Marx's, on some readings).
 Mikhail Bakunin: After Pierre Joseph Proudhon, Bakunin became the most important political philosopher of anarchism. His specific version of anarchism is called collectivist anarchism.
 Jeremy Bentham: The first thinker to analyze social justice in terms of maximization of aggregate individual benefits. Founded the philosophical/ethical school of thought known as utilitarianism.
 Isaiah Berlin: Developed the distinction between positive and negative liberty.
 Edmund Burke: Irish member of the British parliament, Burke is credited with the creation of conservative  thought. Burke's Reflections on the Revolution in France is the most popular of his writings where he denounced the French revolution. Burke was one of the biggest supporters of the American Revolution.
Chanakya: Wrote influential text Arthashastra, some of earliest political thinkers in Asian history.
 Noam Chomsky: He is widely recognized as having helped to spark the cognitive revolution in the human sciences, contributing to the development of a new cognitivistic framework for the study of language and the mind. Chomsky is a leading critic of U.S. foreign policy, neoliberalism and contemporary state capitalism, the Israeli–Palestinian conflict, and mainstream news media. His ideas have proven highly influential in the anti-capitalist and anti-imperialist movements, and aligns with anarcho-syndicalism and libertarian socialism.
 Confucius: The first thinker to relate ethics to the political order.
 William E. Connolly: Helped introduce postmodern philosophy into political theory, and promoted new theories of Pluralism and agonistic democracy.
 John Dewey: Co-founder of pragmatism and analyzed the essential role of education in the maintenance of democratic government.
 Han Feizi: The major figure of the Chinese Fajia (Legalist) school, advocated government that adhered to laws and a strict method of administration.
 Michel Foucault: Critiqued the modern conception of power on the basis of the prison complex and other prohibitive institutions, such as those that designate sexuality, madness and knowledge as the roots of their infrastructure, a critique that demonstrated that subjection is the power formation of subjects in any linguistic forum and that revolution cannot just be thought as the reversal of power between classes.
 Antonio Gramsci: Instigated the concept of hegemony. Argued that the state and the ruling class use culture and ideology to gain the consent of the classes they rule over.
 Thomas Hill Green: Modern liberal thinker and early supporter of positive freedom.
 Jürgen Habermas: Philosopher and social critic. He has pioneered such concepts as the public sphere, communicative action, and deliberative democracy. His early work was heavily influenced by the Frankfurt School.
 Friedrich Hayek: He argued that central planning was inefficient because members of central bodies could not know enough to match the preferences of consumers and workers with existing conditions. Hayek further argued that central economic planning—a mainstay of socialism—would lead to a "total" state with dangerous power. He advocated free-market capitalism in which the main role of the state is to maintain the rule of law and let spontaneous order develop.
 G. W. F. Hegel: Emphasized the "cunning" of history, arguing that it followed a rational trajectory, even while embodying seemingly irrational forces; influenced Marx, Kierkegaard, Nietzsche, and Oakeshott.
 Thomas Hobbes: Generally considered to have first articulated how the concept of a social contract that justifies the actions of rulers (even where contrary to the individual desires of governed citizens), can be reconciled with a conception of sovereignty.
 David Hume: Hume criticized the social contract theory of John Locke and others as resting on a myth of some actual agreement. Hume was a realist in recognizing the role of force to forge the existence of states and that consent of the governed was merely hypothetical. He also introduced the concept of utility, later picked up on and developed by Jeremy Bentham. Hume also coined the 'is/ought' problem i.e. the idea that just because something is does not mean that is how it ought to be. This was very influential on normative politics
 Thomas Jefferson: Politician and political theorist during the American Enlightenment. Expanded on the philosophy of Thomas Paine by instrumenting republicanism in the United States. Most famous for the United States Declaration of Independence.
 Immanuel Kant: Argued that participation in civil society is undertaken not for self-preservation, as per Thomas Hobbes, but as a moral duty. First modern thinker who fully analyzed structure and meaning of obligation. Argued that an international organization was needed to preserve world peace.
 Peter Kropotkin: One of the classic anarchist thinkers and the most influential theorist of anarcho-communism.
 John Locke: Like Hobbes, described a social contract theory based on citizens' fundamental rights in the state of nature. He departed from Hobbes in that, based on the assumption of a society in which moral values are independent of governmental authority and widely shared, he argued for a government with power limited to the protection of personal property. His arguments may have been deeply influential to the formation of the United States Constitution.
 György Lukács: Hungarian Marxist theorist, aesthetician, literary historian, and critic. One of the founders of Western Marxism. In his magnum opus History and Class Consciousness, he developed the Marxist theory of class consciousness and introduced the concept of "reification".
 Niccolò Machiavelli: First systematic analysis of how politics necessitates expedient and evil actions. Gave an account of statecraft in a realistic point of view instead of relying on idealism. Machiavelli also relays recommendations on how to run a well ordered republican state, as he viewed them to be better forms of government than autocracies.
 James Madison: American politician and protege of Jefferson considered to be "Father of the Constitution" and "Father of the Bill of Rights" of the United States. As a political theorist, he believed in separation of powers and proposed a comprehensive set of checks and balances that are necessary to protect the rights of an individual from the tyranny of the majority.
 Herbert Marcuse: Called the father of the new left. One of the principal thinkers within the Frankfurt School, and generally important in efforts to fuse the thought of Sigmund Freud and Karl Marx. Introduced the concept of "repressive desublimation", in which social control can operate not only by direct control, but also by manipulation of desire. His work Eros and Civilization and notion of a non-repressive society was influential on the 1960s and its counter-cultural social movements.
 Karl Marx: In large part, added the historical dimension to an understanding of society, culture and economics. Created the concept of ideology in the sense of (true or false) beliefs that shape and control social actions. Analyzed the fundamental nature of class as a mechanism of governance and social interaction. Profoundly influenced world politics with his theory of communism.
 Mencius: One of the most important thinkers in the Confucian school, he is the first theorist to make a coherent argument for an obligation of rulers to the ruled.
 John Stuart Mill: A utilitarian, and the person who named the system; he goes further than Bentham by laying the foundation for liberal democratic thought in general and modern, as opposed to classical, liberalism in particular. Articulated the place of individual liberty in an otherwise utilitarian framework.
 Montesquieu: Analyzed protection of the people by a "balance of powers" in the divisions of a state.
 Mozi: Eponymous founder of the Mohist school, advocated a form of consequentialism.
 Friedrich Nietzsche: Philosopher who became a powerful influence on a broad spectrum of 20th-century political currents in Marxism, anarchism, fascism, socialism, libertarianism, and conservatism. His interpreters have debated the content of his political philosophy.
 Robert Nozick: Criticized Rawls, and argued for libertarianism, by appeal to a hypothetical history of the state and of property.
 Thomas Paine: Enlightenment writer who defended liberal democracy, the American Revolution, and the French Revolution in Common Sense and The Rights of Man.
 Plato: Wrote a lengthy dialogue The Republic in which he laid out his political philosophy: citizens should be divided into three categories. One category of people are the rulers: they should be philosophers, according to Plato, this idea is based on his Theory of Forms.
 Pierre-Joseph Proudhon: Commonly considered the father of modern anarchism, specifically mutualism.
 Ayn Rand: Founder of Objectivism and prime mover of the Objectivist and Libertarian movements in mid-twentieth-century America. Advocated a complete, laissez-faire capitalism. Rand held that the proper role of government was exclusively the protection of individual rights without economic interference. The government was to be separated from economics the same way and for the same reasons it was separated from religion. Any governmental action not directed at the defense of individual rights would constitute the initiation of force (or threat of force), and therefore a violation not only of rights but also of the legitimate function of government.
John Rawls: Revitalized the study of normative political philosophy in Anglo-American universities with his 1971 book A Theory of Justice, which uses a version of social contract theory to answer fundamental questions about justice and to criticise utilitarianism.
 Murray Rothbard: The central theorist of anarcho-capitalism and an Austrian School economist.
 Jean-Jacques Rousseau: Analyzed the social contract as an expression of the general will, and controversially argued in favor of absolute democracy where the people at large would act as sovereign.
Prabhat Ranjan Sarkar: Known for the socio-economic and political philosophy  Progressive Utilization Theory.
 Carl Schmitt: German political theorist, tied to the Nazis, who developed the concepts of the Friend/Enemy Distinction and the State of exception. Though his most influential books were written in the 1920s, he continued to write prolifically until his death (in academic quasi-exile) in 1985. He heavily influenced 20th-century political philosophy both within the Frankfurt School and among others, not all of whom are philosophers, such as Jacques Derrida, Hannah Arendt, and Giorgio Agamben.
 Adam Smith: Often said to have founded modern economics; explained emergence of economic benefits from the self-interested behavior ("the invisible hand") of artisans and traders. While praising its efficiency, Smith also expressed concern about the effects of industrial labor (e.g., repetitive activity) on workers. His work on moral sentiments sought to explain social bonds which enhance economic activity.
 Socrates: Widely considered the founder of Western political philosophy, via his spoken influence on Athenian contemporaries; since Socrates never wrote anything, much of what we know about him and his teachings comes through his most famous student, Plato.
 Baruch Spinoza: Set forth the first analysis of rational egoism, in which the rational interest of self is conformance with pure reason. To Spinoza's thinking, in a society in which each individual is guided by reason, political authority would be superfluous.
 Max Stirner: Important thinker within anarchism and the main representative of the anarchist current known as individualist anarchism. He was also the founder of ethical egoism which endorses anarchy.
 Leo Strauss: Famously rejected modernity, mostly on the grounds of what he perceived to be modern political philosophy's excessive self-sufficiency of reason and flawed philosophical grounds for moral and political normativity. He argued instead we should return to pre-modern thinkers for answers to contemporary issues. His philosophy was influential on the formation of neoconservatism, and a number of his students later were members of the Bush administration.
 Henry David Thoreau: Influential American thinker on such diverse later political positions and topics such as pacifism, anarchism, environmentalism and civil disobedience who influenced later important political activists such as Leo Tolstoy, Mahatma Gandhi and Martin Luther King Jr.
 Alexis de Tocqueville: A French political scientist and diplomat, known for his works Democracy in America and The Old Regime and the Revolution.
 François-Marie Arouet (Voltaire): French Enlightenment writer, poet, and philosopher famous for his advocacy of civil liberties, including freedom of religion and free trade.
 Bernard Williams: A British moral philosopher whose posthumously published work on political philosophy In the Beginning was the Deed has been seen—along with the works of Raymond Geuss—as a key foundational work on political realism.

See also 

 Anarchist schools of thought
 Consensus decision-making
 Consequentialist justifications of the state
 Critical theory
 Engaged theory
 Justification for the state
 Majoritarianism
 Panarchy
 Philosophy of law
 Political journalism
 Political spectrum
 Political Theory
 Post-structuralism
 Progressivism
 Rechtsstaat
 Rule according to higher law
 Semiotics of culture
 State-centered theory
 Theodemocracy

References

Further reading 
 Academic journals dedicated to political philosophy include: Political Theory, Philosophy and Public Affairs, Contemporary Political Theory, Theory & Event, Constellations, and Journal of Political Philosophy
 
 
 
 
 
 
 
 London Philosophy Study Guide offers many suggestions on what to read, depending on the student's familiarity with the subject: Political Philosophy
 
 Alexander F. Tsvirkun 2008. History of political and legal Teachings of Ukraine. Kharkiv.
 Bielskis, Andrius 2005. Towards a Postmodern Understanding of the Political. Basingstoke, New York: Palgrave-Macmillan.
 Eric Nelson, The Hebrew Republic: Jewish Sources and the Transformation of European Political Thought (Harvard University Press, 2010)

External links 

 
 
 
 Video lectures (require Adobe Flash): Introduction to Political Philosophy delivered by Steven B Smith of Yale University and provided by Academic Earth.

 
Politics
Philosophy of social science
Social philosophy